Simon Read may refer to:

Simon Read (footballer) in 1989–90 Football Conference
Simon Read (artist) who worked with Jock McFadyen
Simon Read, founder of New Star Games

See also
Simon Reed (disambiguation)